Capnolymma cingalensis is a species of beetle in the family Cerambycidae. It was described by Gahan in 1906.

References

Beetles described in 1906
Lepturinae